Robert 'Rab' Kerr is an Irish republican ex-prisoner who spent 18 years in British prisons, during which he spent three years on the 'Blanket Protest' in the H-Blocks and took part in the 'Great Escape' from Long Kesh in 1983. Since his release from prison he has co-authored four books of photographs documenting the history of Belfast during the last century, as well as producing a number of booklets and magazines. In 2008 he wrote what has been described as the first republican tourist guide to Belfast: Republican Belfast: A Political Tourist's Guide. He is married to Sinn Féin politician Jennifer McCann.

Bibliography

 New Lodge: 100 years in pictures; Authors: Joe Baker & Robert Kerr. Publisher: Glenravel Local History Project, 2000
 Snapshots of Belfast 1920–1929; Authors: Joe Baker & Robert Kerr. Publisher: Glenravel Local History Project, [2001]
 Snapshots of Belfast 1930–1939; Authors: Joe Baker & Robert Kerr. Publisher: Glenravel Local History Project, [2001]
 Snapshots of Belfast 1940–1949; Authors: Joe Baker & Robert Kerr. Publisher: Glenravel Local History Project, [2002]
 Republican Belfast: A political tourist's guide; Author: Robert Kerr, Publisher: MSF Press, [2008], 
 Three Gaols: Images of Crumlin Road, Long Kesh and Armagh Prisons; Author: Robert Kerr. Publisher: MSF Press, [2011], 
 The Belfast Mural Guide; Locate Series; Author: Robert Kerr, Publisher: MSF Press, [2014], 
 An Treoir do Mhúrphictiúir Bhéal Feirste; The Belfast Mural Guide (Publication Language:Irish); Author: Robert Kerr, Publisher: MSF Press, [2014],

References

Living people
Paramilitaries from Belfast
Provisional Irish Republican Army members
Republicans imprisoned during the Northern Ireland conflict
Year of birth missing (living people)